Marianina rosea is a species of sea slug, a dendronotid nudibranch, a marine gastropod mollusc in the family Tritoniidae.

Distribution
Marianina rosea was discovered at Ile de Pins, New Caledonia and first described in 1930. It is found throughout the Tropical Indo-Pacific from the Marianas Islands to South Africa.

References

Tritoniidae
Gastropods described in 1930